Stansbury House may refer to:

Stansbury House (Chico, California), listed on the National Register of Historic Places in Butte County, California
Zack Stansbury House, Mt. Washington, Kentucky, listed on the National Register of Historic Places in Bullitt County, Kentucky